Imai ( — characters for "now" and "water well", meaning "new place of residence") is a Japanese surname.

The Japanese characters link to the Japanese-language Wikipedia

, Japanese animator
, voice actress
, artist and politician
, Japanese figure skater
, Japanese cross-country skier
, photographer
, Japanese rock musician
Isao Imai (disambiguation), multiple people
Kenji Imai (disambiguation), multiple people
, Japanese scientist
, Japanese snowboarder
, Japanese organizational theorist
Miki Imai (disambiguation), multiple people
, classical violist
, Japanese swimmer
, merchant
, film director
, Japanese middle-distance runner
, Japanese footballer
, football manager 
, Japanese singer and actor
, voice actor
, Japanese actor

Fictional characters
, a character from Alice Academy
Nobume Imai (今井 信女), a character from Gintama
Lisa Imai (今井 リサ), a character from BanG Dream!

See also

 
 
 

Japanese-language surnames